The 2017–18 Hobart Hurricanes Women's season was the third in the team's history. Coached by Julia Price and captained by Corinne Hall, the Hurricanes finished WBBL03 in last place.

Squad
Each WBBL|03 squad featured 15 active players, with an allowance of up to five marquee signings including a maximum of three from overseas. Australian marquees were defined as players who made at least ten limited-overs appearances for the national team in the three years prior to the cut-off date (24 April 2017).

Personnel changes made ahead of the season included:

 England marquee Heather Knight did not re-sign with the Hurricanes, opting to sit out of the season while recovering from injury. Corinne Hall was subsequently appointed captain, replacing the outgoing Knight (15–14 win–loss record).
 New Zealand marquee Amy Satterthwaite departed the Hurricanes, signing with the Melbourne Renegades.
 England marquee Lauren Winfield signed with the Hurricanes, having played for the Brisbane Heat in WBBL|02 as a replacement player.
 Indian marquee Veda Krishnamurthy signed with the Hurricanes, marking her first appearance in the league.
 Julie Hunter departed the Hurricanes, retiring from cricket after WBBL|02.
 Erin Burns departed the Hurricanes, signing with the Sydney Sixers.
 Stefanie Daffara signed with the Hurricanes, departing the Sydney Thunder.
 Nicola Hancock signed with the Hurricanes, having previously played for the Melbourne Renegades.

Changes made during the season included:

 Irish marquee Isobel Joyce signed as a replacement player for the second-consecutive season. Joyce also stood in as acting captain for five games.

The table below lists the Hurricanes players and their key stats (including runs scored, batting strike rate, wickets taken, economy rate, catches and stumpings) for the season.

Ladder

Fixtures

All times are local

{{Single-innings cricket match|date=23 December 2017|venue=Sydney Cricket Ground, Sydney|rain=|notes=Broadcast by Network Ten
 Double header with Match 5 of the Men's BBL|result=Sydney Sixers won by 9 wickets (with 37 balls remaining)|report=Scorecard|umpires=Ryan Nelson and Claire Polosak|motm=Marizanne Kapp (Sixers)|toss=Hobart Hurricanes won the toss and elected to bat|wickets2=Nicola Hancock 1/14 (2 overs)|time=12:20|runs2=Erin Burns 48* (38)|wickets1=Dane van Niekerk 2/18 (4 overs)|runs1=Veda Krishnamurthy 16 (17)|score2=1/99 (13.5 overs)|score1=98 (19.4 overs)|team2=Sydney Sixers|team1=Hobart Hurricanes|daynight=|round= Match 15|bg=#FFCCCC}}

 Statistics and awards 
 Most runs: Hayley Matthews, Georgia Redmayne – 297 each (equal 17th in the league) Highest score in an innings: Georgia Redmayne – 53 (49) vs Perth Scorchers, 21 January 2018
 Most wickets: Nicola Hancock – 11 (equal 24th in the league) Best bowling figures in an innings: Veronica Pyke – 4/17 (4 overs) vs Adelaide Strikers, 10 December 2017
 Most catches (fielder): Corinne Hall, Hayley Matthews – 5 each (equal 17th in the league)''
 Player of the Match awards: Brooke Hepburn, Hayley Matthews – 1 each
 Hurricanes Player of the Tournament: Hayley Matthews

References

2017–18 Women's Big Bash League season by team
Hobart Hurricanes (WBBL)